USS Edisto may refer to:

  was a  transferred to the Royal Navy as 
  is an  currently in service with the United States Coast Guard

United States Navy ship names